Meidum, Maydum or Maidum is an archaeological site in Lower Egypt. It contains a large pyramid and several mudbrick mastabas. The pyramid was Egypt's first straight-sided one, but it partially collapsed in ancient times.

Pyramid

The pyramid at Meidum is thought to be just the second pyramid built after Djoser's and may have been originally built for Huni, the last pharaoh of the Third Dynasty, and continued by Sneferu. Because of its unusual appearance, the pyramid is called el-heram el-kaddaab – (False Pyramid) in Egyptian Arabic.

The second extension turned the original step pyramid design into a true pyramid by filling in the steps with limestone encasing. While this approach is consistent with the design of the other true pyramids, Meidum was affected by construction errors. Firstly, the outer layer was founded on sand and not on rock, like the inner layers. Secondly, the inner step pyramids had been designed as the final stage. Thus, the outer surface was polished and the platforms of the steps were not horizontal, but fell off to the outside. This severely compromised the stability and is likely to have caused the collapse of the Meidum Pyramid in a downpour while the building was still under construction.

Franck Monnier and others believe the pyramid did not collapse until the New Kingdom, but there are a number of facts contradicting this theory. The Meidum Pyramid seems never to have been completed. Beginning with Sneferu and to the 12th Dynasty, all pyramids had a valley temple, which is missing at Meidum. The mortuary temple, which was found under the rubble at the base of the pyramid, apparently never was finished. Walls were only partly polished. Two stelas inside, usually bearing the names of the pharaoh, are missing inscriptions. The burial chamber inside the pyramid itself is uncompleted, with raw walls and wooden supports still in place which are usually removed after construction. Affiliated mastabas were never used or completed and none of the usual burials have been found. Finally, the first examinations of the Meidum Pyramid found everything below the surface of the rubble mound fully intact. Stones from the outer cover were stolen only after they were exposed by the excavations. This makes a catastrophic collapse more probable than a gradual one. The collapse of this pyramid during the reign of Sneferu is the likely reason for the change from 54 to 43 degrees of his second pyramid at Dahshur, the Bent Pyramid.

By the time it was investigated by Napoleon's Expedition in 1799, the Meidum Pyramid had its present three steps. It is commonly assumed the pyramid still had five steps in the fifteenth century and was gradually falling further into ruin, because al-Maqrizi described it as looking like a five-stepped mountain, but Mendelssohn claimed this might be the result of a loose translation and al-Makrizi's words would more accurately translate into "five-storied mountain", a description which could even match the present state of the pyramid with four bands of different masonry at the base and a step on top.

Excavations

The Meidum Pyramid  was excavated by John Shae Perring in 1837, Lepsius in 1843 and then by Flinders Petrie later in the nineteenth century, who located the mortuary temple, facing to the east. In 1920 Ludwig Borchardt studied the area further, followed by Alan Rowe in 1928 and then Ali el-Kholi in the 1970s.

The chamber is unlikely to have been used for any burial.

Flinders Petrie was the first Egyptologist to establish the facts of its original design dimensions and proportions. In its final form it was 1100 cubits of 0.523 m around by 175 cubits high, thus showing the same proportions as the Great Pyramid at Giza, and therefore the same circular symbolism. Petrie wrote in the 1892 excavation report  that "We see then that there is an exactly analogous theory for the dimensions of Medum [sic] to that of the Great Pyramid; in each the approximate ratio of 7:44 is adopted, as referred to the radius and circle ..." These proportions equated to the four outer faces sloping in by precisely 51.842° or 51°50'35", which would have been understood and expressed by the Ancient Egyptians as a seked slope of 5 palms.

See also 
 List of ancient Egyptian sites, including sites of temples
 List of Egyptian pyramids

References

Bibliography

Meidum: Site of the Broken Pyramid & Remnants of the First True Pyramid- Virtual-Egypt
John Legon article on the Architectural Proportions of the Pyramid of Meidum

Further reading
Arnold, Dieter (1991). Building in Egypt: Pharaonic Stone Masonry. Oxford: Oxford University Press. 
Jackson, K. & Stamp, J. (2002). Pyramid: Beyond Imagination. Inside the Great Pyramid of Giza. London: BBC Worldwide.

External links

Former world's tallest buildings
Pyramids of the Fourth Dynasty of Egypt
Archaeological sites in Egypt
1837 archaeological discoveries
Sneferu
Buildings and structures completed in the 26th century BC